The Grosseto Baseball Club is a baseball franchise based in the city of Grosseto, Tuscany in Italy, which was founded in 1952.

History
Grosseto BBC was previously a franchise in Italy's top professional competition, the Italian Baseball League. Grosseto was represented in the IBL's top league, Series A, by several teams with different nicknames over a span of nine seasons from 1999 to 2008. Teams from Grosseto won Series A titles in 1986, 1989, 2004, and 2007. The club also won Gold at the 2005 European Cup tournament.

The club was relegated to Series C after the 2011 season due to financial troubles. As a result, the franchise shut down after 60 years. In 2012 a new team was established to replace the old one under the name Grosseto Baseball. The restructured club rejoined the Italian Baseball League in 2013, though they were forced to play in Series C due to budget limitations. In 2014, Grosseto returned to Series A and won the league championship.

See also
Grosseto Baseball Club players

Sources
Baseball Reference – Italian Baseball League
Grosseto Baseball

Baseball teams in Italy
1952 establishments in Italy